The following is a list of the 11 cantons of the Corse-du-Sud department, in France, following the French canton reorganisation which came into effect in March 2015:

 Ajaccio-1
 Ajaccio-2
 Ajaccio-3
 Ajaccio-4
 Ajaccio-5
 Bavella
 Grand Sud
 Gravona-Prunelli
 Sartenais-Valinco
 Sevi-Sorru-Cinarca
 Taravo-Ornano

References

 
Corse-du-Sud-related lists